Ximenkou Station may refer to:

Ximenkou Station (Guangzhou), on Line 1, Guangzhou Metro, China
Ximenkou Station (Ningbo), on Line 1, Ningbo Rail Transit, China